Rock Legends: Buffalo is a compilation album by Australian hard rock band Buffalo, issued in 1980 via PolyGram/Vertigo Records. Buffalo had been active from 1971 to 1977 and provided five studio albums, Dead Forever... (1972), Volcanic Rock (1973), Only Want You for Your Body (1974), Mother's Choice (1976) and Average Rock 'n' Roller (1977).

Reception 

Tracks compiled on Rock Legends: Buffalo were reviewed at I-94 Bar. Steve Danno-Lorkin described "Suzie Sunshine" as "a great piece of heavy melodic rock with some neat slide guitar from [Baxter]," while "Sunrise (Come My Way)" should "escalate the band to the worldwide stadiums", "Shylock", will "blow your head off with high-energy rifforama" and "Skirt Lifter" was "unlikely to be played on Catholic church-owned radio station 2SM."

Track listing 

 ^^track originally titled, "I'm a Skirt Lifter, not a Shirt Raiser"
 &&track originally titled "Just a Little Rock 'n' Roll (A Shot of Rhythm and Blues)"

References 

Buffalo (band) albums
1980 compilation albums